Freak of Nature is the second studio album by American singer Anastacia. It was released on November 23, 2001, by Epic Records and Daylight Records. The album was primarily produced by Ric Wake, Sam Watters, and Louis Biancaniello, with additional production from Richie Jones. It debuted and peaked at number 27 on the US Billboard 200, while reaching number four in the United Kingdom and number one in Belgium, Denmark, Germany, the Netherlands, Norway, Sweden, and Switzerland. As of September 2012, Freak of Nature had sold over 4.5 million copies worldwide.

Release
For the US edition of the album, three tracks from the album were remixed ("One Day in Your Life", "You'll Never Be Alone", and "Don't Stop (Doin' It)"). A new track, "I Thought I Told You That", a collaboration with Faith Evans, was also included on the US album. A collectors edition of the album was released in Europe in November 2002, featuring a bonus disc containing "I Thought I Told You That", a cover version of the Disney song "Someday My Prince Will Come", and "Boom" (which served as the 2002 FIFA World Cup official song), as well as three remixes and two live recordings.

Track listing

Notes
  signifies an additional producer
  signifies a remixer
 "Boom" does not appear on the UK collectors edition bonus disc

Sample credits
 "Don'tcha Wanna" contains portions of "I Believe (When I Fall in Love It Will Be Forever)" by Stevie Wonder.

Charts

Weekly charts

Year-end charts

Certifications

Release history

References

2001 albums
Albums produced by Ric Wake
Albums produced by Sam Watters
Anastacia albums
Daylight Records albums
Epic Records albums